is a Japanese former professional baseball infielder,  catcher, and current forth squad infield and base coach for the Fukuoka SoftBank Hawks of Nippon Professional Baseball (NPB).

He previously played for the Fukuoka Daiei Hawks and the Chinatrust Whales of the CPBL.

Professional career

Active player era
On November 21, 1997, Sasagawa was drafted 6th overall by the Fukuoka Daiei Hawks in the  1997 Nippon Professional Baseball draft.

In 1998-2022 season, he played in the Western League of NPB's second league.

In 2003 season, Sasagawa traded for Chen Wen-bin of the Chinatrust Whales of the CPBL at the deadline. And he played in eight games and batting average .200.

In 2004 season, he returned to the Hawks to make his Pacific League debut.

He was a member of the Hawks for eight seasons, with a total of 23 games played, a .235 batting average, four hits. He retired during the 2005 season.

After retirement
After his retirement, Sasagawa had been a scout for the Fukuoka SoftBank Hawks since the 2006 season, acquiring players such as Yuya Hasegawa.

He served as the third squad infield and base coach from the 2011 season through 2013.

From the 2014 season through the 2016 season he served as the dormitory manager and farm team assistant staff for the Hawks players' dormitory.

He was again named the third squad infield and base coach for the 2017 season, then the second squad infield defensive base coach for the 2021 season, and the third squad infield and base coach for the 2022 season.

He will serve as the forth squad infield and base coach beginning with the 2023 season.

References

External links

 Career statistics - NPB.jp 
 97 Takashi Sasagawa PLAYERS2022 - Fukuoka SoftBank Hawks Official site

1979 births
Living people
Japanese baseball players
Chinatrust Whales players
Fukuoka Daiei Hawks players
Fukuoka SoftBank Hawks players
Japanese baseball coaches
Nippon Professional Baseball catchers
Nippon Professional Baseball infielders
Baseball people from Tokyo